Eudigonidae is a family of millipedes belonging to the order Chordeumatida. Adult millipedes in this family have 30 or 32 segments (counting the collum as the first segment and the telson as the last).

Genera:
 Ancudia Shear, 1988
 Eudigona Silvestri, 1903

References

Chordeumatida
Endemic fauna of Chile